Solar eclipses on the Moon are caused when the planet Earth passes in front of the Sun and blocks its light. Viewers on Earth experience a lunar eclipse during a solar eclipse on the Moon.

These solar eclipses are only seen in the near side portion and smaller parts of the far side where Earth is seen during librations, these areas of the moon making up the visible portion of the Moon. Eclipses there are seen during the lunar sunrise and sunset and extend to the furthermost areas of the near side but mainly not in the polar areas of the Moon. While the Moon orbits Earth, Earth rotates once in nearly 24 hours, but its position at the sky is only in one position, as it never changes. This is in contrast to some other moons or other satellites orbiting other planets or dwarf planets and a few asteroids, even inside the Solar System. They are, however, very rare in the outer part of the Solar System. 

The last solar eclipse on the Moon was a total eclipse on 8 November 2022, with the entire near side and tiny surroundings of the far side seeing totality. The next total eclipse won't be until March 2025.

Length

Unlike the Earth, which sees its eclipse for up to two and a half hours, the longest eclipse that can be viewed in one area on the Moon lasts for up to five and a half hours. Some long eclipses on the Moon, however, usually last for about five hours in one area, with the Earth's shadow touching the Moon for a maximum of six hours.

Some eclipses are longer when the Earth is slightly closer to the Moon. During such on eclipses, the Moon is seen on Earth with its apparent diameter larger than the Sun's. Meanwhile, some eclipses are shorter when the Earth is slightly further away from the Moon. On Earth, the Moon is seen with its apparent diameter smaller than the Sun's.

Unlike the Earth, where its eclipses start and end at a different place, all of the Moon's solar eclipses begin in the westernmost parts of the near side and end in the easternmost parts of the near side.

Solar eclipses starting near and within the polar areas are always partial, while solar eclipses starting at or within the equator are always total.

Penumbral shadow
In its eclipses, the penumbral shadow does not appear until it is around 25–30% obscuration. It becomes slightly darker when the Earth blocks the sunlight until it reaches totality in some eclipses.

In some eclipses, its penumbral shadow covers the whole surface, whereas the center of the Earth's shadow misses a portion of the Moon while every part of the Nearside sees a partial eclipse. These eclipses are very rare. The last century that not all parts of the near side and the surrounding parts of the far side saw only as partial was the 18th century.  On Earth, they are seen as total penumbral eclipses.

The Moon passes a narrow path within the penumbra and outside the umbra. It can happen on the Earth's northern or southern penumbral edges.

These eclipses can last up to four and a half hours without having any part of the Moon, notably at its poles, reaching totality.

Centre of the Earth's shadow
Unlike the Earth, which receives the smallest portion being inside the centre of the Moon's shadow during total solar eclipses, during total eclipses on the Moon, the center of the Earth's shadow covers the whole near side of the Moon and lasts much longer than on Earth, up to 1.8 hours.  Some total-partial eclipses have at most half or a part of the Moon being in the center of the Earth's shadow.

Unlike the Earth, whose umbral shadow appears black, as the Moon has no atmosphere, the surface appears not just black but red and brown, according to the Danjon scale. This is because the only sunlight available is refracted through the Earth's atmosphere on the edges of the Earth, forming an atmospheric ring.

Temperatures during long totality

During eclipses with long totality, temperatures plunge on the moon but not in many of its seas. However, in some areas, the temperatures remain high. This especially applies to Oceanus Procellarum and Mare Tranquillitatis and mid to large craters, especially those with basalt floors and mostly in the middle portion of the Moon, some young craters, and a few distant large craters, notably Tycho (located at 43.31°S). Some craters are slightly cooler but as warm as the surface and warmer than areas outside the basins such as Copernicus and Langrenus.

Partial eclipses
On the Moon, when there is a partial eclipse, a part of the Moon has a partial eclipse, either north or south. One example of this is when half of the Sun is blocked, north or south. In some partial eclipses when the center of the Earth's shadow misses the Moon, one hemisphere can have a partial eclipse while the other does not.  In some eclipses, when the center of the Earth's shadow covers a part or most, one part has a total eclipse, and one part has a partial eclipse. Partial and total eclipses together with simply partial last for up to about six hours without having totality in all parts of the near side and a very small part of the far side next to the near side. Standalone partial and total eclipses between partial eclipses can last up to 3.5 hours.

At its edges of the near side and its small surroundings
At the edges of the near side and a small surrounding part of the hard side where the Earth is mostly half- or partly-seen, in the west, some solar eclipses begin at sunrise, and the Sun is seen after sunrise. In some eclipses, the Sun is partially visible, partially eclipsed in others. In the east, some solar eclipses end at sunset, and the Sun is seen before sunset. In other eclipses, the Sun is partially visible. 

It also occurs in several polar areas. In that part of the Moon, the Earth is seen in the high-altitude areas of craters, hills, and mountains, as well as a few areas such as lunar seas (also known as plains). In some areas, it is visible in deep craters and most of the surrounding lower-ground areas. In the middle parts, the Earth is never visible, and its eclipses are never seen as the crater and its mountains, including crater ones, block the view.  In areas around seven to eight degrees near the far side, a part of the Earth's view is blocked. In some eclipses, this phenomenon begins not long after sunrise in the west and ends not long before sunset in the east. At that location, they are seen at higher altitudes and at most medium altitudes.

At the furthermost areas of the far side within the near side, a part of the Earth is seen but only in the highest portions.

Exception on one part of the Moon
About ninety-one percent of the far side never experiences solar eclipses as the Earth is never seen there because the limit of the view of the planet during librations is about eight degrees within the near side.

Eclipses are generally not seen in the fringes of the near side, within the far side, or in the lower and most of the middle parts. Around it, it is not seen in the lower parts. In that location and around it, the eclipses are never seen in most crater hollows or some of the lowest parts of some crater hollows.  Eclipses are never seen in crater hollows in the polar regions where the sun never shines. Between the 75th and the 80th parallel north or south, eclipses are never seen in most crater hollows such as the middle and, notably, the lowest portions.

History
In early lunar history, after around 4.3 billion years, when the Moon was formed, it orbited closer to Earth. The totality of its eclipses lasted longer than current eclipses. Millions of years later, the totality shrank, and the partial portion of the eclipse was rising. Eclipses were more frequent around this time. Tens of millions of years later, eclipses became less numerous as the lunar orbit slowly moved away from the Earth. The view of the sun, even its chromosphere, was blocked by the Earth. Around some hundreds of millions of years ago, the Earth blocked all of the Sun's chromosphere; totality was slightly longer than the partial portion. At the same time, there were more partial eclipses on the Moon. As the Moon recedes about 3.8 centimeters each year, the eclipse totality length slowly shrinks, and the partial portion slowly lengthens.

Saros series
The Solar Saros series of the Moon is the equivalent to the Lunar Saros series of the Earth.

In popular culture
In a package of Wills's Cigarettes, one of the tobacco cards first issued in 1928 for a few years displays a solar eclipse on the Moon showing the atmospheric ring.  This is considered the first depiction of a solar eclipse as seen on the Moon.

See also
Lunar eclipse
Danjon scale
Solar eclipses on Mars
Solar eclipses on Jupiter
Solar eclipses on Neptune
Solar eclipses on Saturn
Solar eclipses on Uranus

References

External links 
 KAGUYA (SELENE) Successfully Captures Moving Images of the Earth at the Time of a Penumbral Lunar Eclipse using HDTV  SELENE

Related articles
  - the first card displaying the solar eclipse on the Moon
  - on the Moon's hotspots in the Earth-facing hemisphere during solar eclipses (lunar eclipses on Earth)
 

Solar eclipses
Moon